A bustline is an arbitrary line encircling the fullest part of the bust or body circumference at the bust.  It is a body measurement which measures the circumference of a woman's torso at the level of the breasts. It is measured by keeping a measuring tape horizontal and wrapping it around the body so that it goes over the nipples and under the arms.

In relation to a woman's garment, the bustline is the outline or shape of a woman's bust, or the part of the garment which covers the breasts, such as a dress with a fitted bustline. The bustline is an important measure in women's clothing sizes.

A full bust is another term for the bustline measure but is also commonly used to refer to a breast with a cup size of at least C.

Other measures
These measures are usually taken when taking measurements for the bustline of a woman's garment, especially if the garment is to be form-fitting at the bust.
 A high bust is a measure of a woman's torso above her breasts.
 An under-bust is the measure below the breasts.

See also
 Hemline
 Neckline
 Waistline

References

Anthropometry
Sizes in clothing
Body shape